The Imitation Game is a 2014 film based on a biography of Alan Turing.

The Imitation Game may also refer to:

 Imitation game or Turing test, a test of a machine's ability to exhibit intelligent behaviour by Alan Turing
 The Imitation Game (play), 1980 British television play
 The Imitation Game (TV series), 2018 British television game show

See also
 Imitation (disambiguation)